Anthony Joseph Gumbiner is a British businessman based in Monte Carlo who is chairman of Hallwood Group.

References

Living people
British businesspeople
Year of birth missing (living people)